The 2007 Nigerian Senate election in Ekiti State was held on April 21, 2007, to elect members of the Nigerian Senate to represent Ekiti State. Sylvester Ayodele Arise representing Ekiti North, Adefemi Kila representing Ekiti Central and Sola Akinyede representing Ekiti South all won on the platform of the Peoples Democratic Party.

Overview

Summary

Results

Ekiti North 
The election was won by Sylvester Ayodele Arise of the Peoples Democratic Party.

Ekiti Central 
The election was won by Adefemi Kila of the Peoples Democratic Party.

Ekiti South 
The election was won by Sola Akinyede of the Peoples Democratic Party.

References 

April 2007 events in Nigeria
Ekiti State Senate elections
Eki